The Jayawijaya Mountains, formerly known as the Orange Range, are the eastern mountain range of the Maoke Mountains in the central highlands region of the Indonesian part of New Guinea. The Baliem River has its source in the range.

Inhabitants of the range include the Ketengban.

In 1997 sightings of animals matching the description of the thylacine, an extinct Australian marsupial were reported from "the Jayawijaya region of Irian Jaya".

See also
 List of highest mountains of New Guinea

Footnotes

References
  (1999): Ethno-ornithology of the Ketengban People, Indonesian New Guinea. In: : Folkbiology: 17–46. MIT Press. 
  (1997): Irian Jayans spy 'Tassie Tiger' . Version of 1997-AUG-20. Retrieved 2008-JUN-17.

Mountain ranges of Western New Guinea